John Emery Little (born September 24, 1984) is an American professional basketball coach and former player, currently an assistant coach for the Wisconsin Herd of the NBA G League. In his playing career, Little played the shooting guard position. On October 10, 2016, he signed a four-year deal with the German club Science City Jena, but two sides parted ways on November 18.

Following the close of his professional career, Little became video coordinator at his alma mater, Northern Iowa for two seasons. Little was announced as a part of the Wisconsin Herd coaching staff on September 24, 2019.

References

1984 births
Living people
American expatriate basketball people in Germany
American men's basketball coaches
American men's basketball players
Basketball coaches from Illinois
Basketball players from Illinois
BG Göttingen players
Riesen Ludwigsburg players
Northern Iowa Panthers men's basketball players
s.Oliver Würzburg players
Science City Jena players
Shooting guards
Skyliners Frankfurt players
Sportspeople from Peoria, Illinois
Wisconsin Herd coaches